These are the official results of the Men's Hammer Throw event at the 1993 World Championships in Stuttgart, Germany. There were a total of 28 participating athletes, with the final held on Sunday August 15, 1993. The qualification mark was set at 77.00 metres.

Medalists

Schedule
All times are Central European Time (UTC+1)

Abbreviations
All results shown are in metres

Records

Qualification

Group A

Group B

Final

See also
 1992 Men's Olympic Hammer Throw
 1993 Hammer Throw Year Ranking

References
 Results
 hammerthrow.wz

H
Hammer throw at the World Athletics Championships